The discus throw is one of four track and field throwing events held at the Summer Olympics. The men's discus throw has been present on the Olympic athletics programme since 1896 (one of two throws events at the first Olympics, alongside the shot put). The women's event was first contested at the 1928 Olympics, being one of the five athletics events in the inaugural Olympic women's programme.

Two variations on the event have been contested at the Olympics: a two-handed competition at the 1912 Stockholm Olympics, with athletes using both left and right arm putting techniques, and a stone throw at the 1906 Intercalated Games.

Medalists (shows down below)

Men

Multiple medalists

Medalists by country

Women

Multiple medalists

Medalists by country

 The German total includes teams both competing as Germany and the United Team of Germany, but not East or West Germany.

Intercalated Games
The 1906 Intercalated Games were held in Athens and at the time were officially recognised as part of the Olympic Games series, with the intention being to hold a games in Greece in two-year intervals between the internationally held Olympics. However, this plan never came to fruition and the International Olympic Committee (IOC) later decided not to recognise these games as part of the official Olympic series. Some sports historians continue to treat the results of these games as part of the Olympic canon.

Martin Sheridan, the Olympic champion in 1904 and 1908, won the 1906 title as well. A 1904 medallist, Nikolaos Georgantas, was runner-up, while Verner Järvinen took the bronze medal in addition to the Greek-style event gold medal he won at the 1906 Games.

Greek-style discus throw
At both the 1906 Intercalated Games and the 1908 London Olympics, a Greek-style discus throwing competition was held. This variant had athletes stood on a raised pedestal and throwing the implement in a prescribed technique, which was suggested to emulate the throwing technique of the Ancient Olympic Games. Academics studying ancient Greek artefacts stated that the style was a misinterpretation of a text. Verner Järvinen was the 1906 champion after winning the bronze medal with the standard-style. Martin Sheridan won both Greek-style and regular-style gold medals in 1908.

Two-handed discus throw
At the 1912 Stockholm Olympics a two-handed variant of the standard discus throw competition took place. Each athlete had three attempts using each hand and their score was calculated by adding their best performances for the left and right hands. It featured two rounds, with the top three after the first round receiving a further three attempts with each arm.

All three of the medallists took part in the main Olympic men's discus event and Finland's Armas Taipale emerged as a double gold medallist. Silver medallist Elmer Niklander also won a medal in the two-handed shot put. Third place Emil Magnusson won the only Olympic medal of his career in the event.

Non-canonical Olympic events
In addition to the main 1900 Olympic men's discus throw, a handicap competition was held four days later. Gustaf Söderström, who had placed sixth in the main event, took first place with a throw of 40.50 m, having had a handicap of 5.5 m. Gyula Strausz, 13th in the main discus, was runner-up with 39.49 m off a 6.3 m handicap. Karl Gustaf Staaf, a gold medalist in the tug of war, was third with 38.80 m (8 m handicap)

The handicap event returned at the 1904 Summer Olympics. Martin Sheridan and Ralph Rose repeated their 1–2 placings from the Olympic men's discus and John Biller, fifth in the main event, took third place.

These events are no longer considered part of the official Olympic history of the discus throw or the athletics programme in general. Consequently, medals from these competitions have not been assigned to nations on the all-time medal tables.

References
Participation and athlete data
Athletics Men's Discus Throw Medalists. Sports Reference. Retrieved on 2014-04-18.
Athletics Women's Discus Throw Medalists. Sports Reference. Retrieved on 2014-04-18.
Olympic record progressions
Mallon, Bill (2012). TRACK & FIELD ATHLETICS - OLYMPIC RECORD PROGRESSIONS. Track and Field News. Retrieved on 2014-03-12.
Specific

External links
IAAF discus throw homepage
Official Olympics website
Olympic athletics records from Track & Field News

kji

 
Olympics
Discus throw